Michał Kwiecień  (born March 1, 1957) is a Polish bridge player. Kwiecień won the 1998 World Open Pairs Championship with Jacek Pszczoła.

References

External links
 
 

1957 births
Polish contract bridge players
Living people
Sportspeople from Lublin